Shchadrowshchyna is a village in Belarus. It is located in the Minsk District of Minsk Region, 30 km north of the capital Minsk. The Huyka river begins near the village.

Population 
 18th century:
 1795 — 75 people (31 men, 44 women).
 1800 — 75 people (31 men, 44 women)
 19th century:
 1847 — 60 parishioners (30 men, 30 women).
 1865 — 26 people.
 20th century:
 1905 — 134 people (66 men, 68 women).
 1999 — 26 people.
 21st century:
 2009 — 24 people.
 2012 — 13 people.

References

Villages in Belarus
Populated places in Minsk Region
Minsk District